The 1994 Shell Rimula-X season was the 10th season of the franchise in the Philippine Basketball Association (PBA).

Draft picks

Occurrences
After a dismal performance by the team in the All-Filipino, coach Rino Salazar was replaced by former Shell mentor Joe Lipa beginning the Commissioner’s Cup.  

On July 31, Seven-time best import Bobby Parks was accused of deliberately throwing games after Shell lost to San Miguel in overtime by one point in their last outing in the eliminations of the Commissioners Cup. Shell’s loss to the Beermen eliminated Toñdena 65, who were hoping to gain a tie with San Miguel and a playoff for the last semifinals berth. Bobby Parks didn’t finish the whole conference for the first time in his eight PBA seasons. He was replaced by Jerome Lane starting the Commissioners Cup semifinal round.

In the Governor's Cup, Shell’s original choice Guy Taylor was unimpressive in their exhibition match against Pepsi Mega in Subic and was sent home in favor of Carl Ray Harris.

Roster

Transactions

Trades

Additions

Recruited imports

References

Shell Turbo Chargers seasons
Shell